Lorenza Francesca Izzo Parsons (born September 19, 1989) is a Chilean actress and model. She has appeared in films, including Aftershock (2012), The Green Inferno (2013),  Knock Knock (2015), and Quentin Tarantino's Once Upon a Time in Hollywood (2019).

Early life 
Izzo was born in Santiago, Chile, to Chilean model . She is of Italian descent on her father's side. She has a younger sister, Clara Lyon Parsons, who is a model as well. When she was twelve years old, she moved to Atlanta with her father, then working towards a Ph.D. at Georgia Institute of Technology. She was bullied over her strong Chilean accent as a child, but stated she "got over [her] accent pretty fast" after watching the 2002 sports film Blue Crush several times. Izzo recalls becoming "obsessed with [Blue Crush star] Kate Bosworth."

Career 
In 2007, Izzo was modeling and studying journalism at the University of the Andes (Universidad de los Andes) when she moved to New York City to study acting at the Lee Strasberg Theatre and Film Institute.

In 2010, she made her debut as an actress in Instrucciones para mi funeral (Instructions for my Funeral), an independent film made by Sebastián Radic as a graduation project.

Izzo's modeling career reached its peak in 2011 when Izzo and her mother were invited to São Paulo Fashion Week where they met Gisele Bundchen. The meeting resulted in Izzo becoming the new face of Colcci, a Brazilian fashion company.

In 2012, with one commercial feature movie to her name and three more then-about to be released Que pena tu familia (What a Pity About Your Family), Aftershock, and The Green Inferno (directed by her then-future husband, now ex-husband, Eli Roth), Izzo moved to Los Angeles, when she soon secured small roles in Hemlock Grove and the failed television pilot I Am Victor.

In 2015, Izzo starred alongside Keanu Reeves and Ana de Armas in Knock Knock (her second horror film directed by Eli Roth), filmed in Santiago's Chicureo neighbourhood.

Personal life 
On November 8, 2014, Izzo married American actor and director Eli Roth on the beach of Zapallar, Chile. The pair were introduced through mutual friend and director Nicolás López during production of 2012's Aftershock. López was unaware Izzo could speak English and she was originally to play a small role in the film. After Izzo revealed she could speak English fluently, Roth ended up casting her in the lead, where they "spent the whole shooting process together". She attributes the start of their relationship to "the randomness of the world". In July 2018, the couple filed for divorce, and settled their divorce in August 2019. Izzo publicly came out as pansexual in an online interview with actress Emily Hampshire for the 2020 Pride Month. In 2023 Izzo married her long - term girlfriend Sophie Tabet.

Filmography

Film

Television

Awards and nominations

References

External links

1989 births
Chilean television actresses
Chilean female models
Chilean film actresses
Chilean people of Italian descent
Living people
People from Santiago
20th-century Chilean actresses
21st-century Chilean actresses
Chilean emigrants to the United States
Pansexual actresses
LGBT models
Chilean LGBT actors
20th-century Chilean LGBT people
21st-century Chilean LGBT people